Akaki Devadze (born 28 November 1971) is a retired Georgian footballer who played as a goalkeeper.

He played for the Georgian national team between 1992 and 1996 and from 2004 to 2005, and was capped 20 times.

External links

Appearances for Georgia National Team

1971 births
Living people
Footballers from Georgia (country)
Soviet footballers
Georgia (country) international footballers
FC Dinamo Tbilisi players
FC Rostov players
Russian Premier League players
Hapoel Tayibe F.C. players
Maccabi Ironi Ashdod F.C. players
FC Zugdidi players
Israeli Premier League players
Footballers from Tbilisi
Association football goalkeepers
Expatriate footballers from Georgia (country)
Expatriate footballers in Russia
Expatriate footballers in Israel
Expatriate sportspeople from Georgia (country) in Russia
Expatriate sportspeople from Georgia (country) in Israel